Leif Wager (11 February 1922 – 23 March 2002) was a Finnish actor. He appeared in 75 films and television shows between 1940 and 2001. He starred in the film Kaks' tavallista Lahtista, which was entered into the 10th Berlin International Film Festival.

He is buried in the Hietaniemi Cemetery in Helsinki.

Selected filmography
 North Express (1947)
 A Night in Rio (1951)
 Island Girl (1953)
 Sven Tuuva the Hero (1958)
 Kaks' tavallista Lahtista (1960)
 Hobitit (1993)

References

External links

1922 births
2002 deaths
Male actors from Helsinki
Finnish people of Norwegian descent
Burials at Hietaniemi Cemetery
Finnish male film actors